Elachistocleis skotogaster (common name: Santa Victoria oval frog) is a species of frog in the family Microhylidae. It is known with certainty only from the Salta Province in northern Argentina. However, the type locality and some later observations are near the border to Bolivia, and it is possible that some frogs from Bolivia currently attributed to Elachistocleis ovalis belong to this species.

Elachistocleis skotogaster is known from its type locality, a subtropical montane moist forest, and another humid montane forest locality. There are acoustic observations of calling males from roadside ponds from further two localities, all in the Salta Province of Argentina. Breeding takes place in temporary ponds.

References

skotogaster
Amphibians of Argentina
Endemic fauna of Argentina
Taxonomy articles created by Polbot
Amphibians described in 2003